Epiphthora acropasta is a moth of the family Gelechiidae. It was described by Turner in 1919. It is found in Australia, where it has been recorded from Queensland.

The wingspan is about 8 mm. The forewings are white with scanty pale ochreous-fuscous irroration, more pronounced near the apex. The discal dots are not defined and there is an ochreous-fuscous dot at the tornus, another beneath the costa at four-fifths, and several between this and the apex. The hindwings are whitish.

References

Moths described in 1919
Epiphthora